The 1978–79 Scottish Inter-District Championship was a rugby union competition for Scotland's district teams.

This season saw the 26th Scottish Inter-District Championship.

South won the competition with 3 wins.

1978-79 League Table

Results

Round 1

North and Midlands: 

South:

Edinburgh District: 

Glasgow District:

Round 2

Glasgow District: 

North and Midlands: 

South: 

Edinburgh District:

Round 3

South: 

Glasgow District: 

North and Midlands: 

Edinburgh District:

Matches outwith the Championship

Other Scottish matches

Trial matches

Probables: 

Possibles:

References

1978–79 in Scottish rugby union
1978–79